Francis A. Yindra (January 17, 1906 – July 7, 1972) was a member of the Wisconsin State Assembly and the Wisconsin State Senate.

Biography
Yindra was born on January 17, 1906, in Manitowoc, Wisconsin. He graduated from Lincoln High School, Marquette University and Marquette University Law School. Yindra died in July 1972.

Career
Yindra was a member of the assembly in 1933 and 1937 and of the Senate in 1939. Previously, he was an unsuccessful candidate for the Senate in 1922. He was a Democrat.

References

People from Manitowoc, Wisconsin
Democratic Party Wisconsin state senators
Marquette University alumni
Marquette University Law School alumni
1906 births
1972 deaths
20th-century American politicians
Democratic Party members of the Wisconsin State Assembly